Tessy Scholtes (born 1 June 1981 in Luxembourg City) is a Luxembourgian karateka and politician. 

In 2002, she finished as runner-up in the world championships in the kumite 60 kg+ category.  For the achievement, she won the title of Luxembourgian Sportswoman of the Year. On 7 December 2009 she declared her retreat for personal reasons.

She is a member of the Christian Social People's Party (CSV).  In the 2009 election to the Chamber of Deputies, Scholtes ran in the Centre constituency.  She finished thirteenth on the CSV list.  On 3 May 2011 she was sworn into parliament in order to replace Mill Majerus, who had recently died in a car accident.

Footnotes

External links
 Tessy Scholtes official website

Luxembourgian female karateka
Christian Social People's Party politicians
Members of the Chamber of Deputies (Luxembourg)
Luxembourgian sportsperson-politicians
1981 births
Living people
Sportspeople from Luxembourg City
World Games silver medalists
Competitors at the 2001 World Games
World Games medalists in karate